The 1940 Texas Tech Red Raiders football team represented Texas Technological College—now known as Texas Tech University—as a member of the Border Conference during the 1940 college football season. Led by Pete Cawthon in his 11th and final season as head coach, the Red Raiders compiled an overall record of 9–1–1 with a mark of 0–1 in conference play. The team played home games at Tech Field in Lubbock, Texas.

Schedule

Rankings

References

Texas Tech
Texas Tech Red Raiders football seasons
Texas Tech Red Raiders football